"Swear" was a 1980s pop song by Tim Scott McConnell and released by Sire Records in 1983.

Background
The music video to promote the song was a campy/tongue-in-cheek music video of a hippy-based pagan/black mass set in a church. The stylized music video is seemingly a parody of late 1960s to early 1970s hippy horror movies.

McConnell would later comment on the song: "This was my young and confused record...I wrote the songs over a couple of weeks on a little Casio keyboard...Sire heard it and offered me a deal...no use appologising for such a thing...my mistake... the good part of it was working with Richard Gottehrer ...really took me under his wing...shame we were working on the wrong kind of music.."

Charts

Cover versions
Sheena Easton covered the song for her 1984 album A Private Heaven. It reached #80 on the Billboard Hot 100 chart the following year.

References

External links
 Music video of Swear - Tim Scott (1983)
 Music video of Swear - Sheena Easton (1985)

1983 songs
1983 singles
1985 singles
Sheena Easton songs
Sire Records singles
Parodies of horror